Raquel Kops-Jones and Abigail Spears were the defending champions, but they lost to Paula Kania and Kateřina Siniaková in the semifinals.
Garbiñe Muguruza and Carla Suárez Navarro won the title, defeating Kania and Siniaková in the final, 6–2, 4–6, [10–5].

Seeds

Draw

Draw

External links
 Main draw

Bank of the West Classic - Doubles
2014 Doubles